Habib Gordani (born June 9, 1983) is an Iranian footballer.

Club career
Gordani has been with Shahrdari Tabriz since 2007. He signed with Tractor Sazi in 2012. He has played his entire career in the city of Tabriz. In 2014 Gordani won the Hazfi Cup with Tractor Sazi.

Sepahan
In the summer of 2015 after being released by Tractor Sazi, Gordani signed a two-year contract with Sepahan on 5 July 2015.

Honours
Tractor Sazi
 Hazfi Cup (1): 2013–14

References

Living people
Shahrdari Tabriz players
Iranian footballers
1983 births
Sportspeople from Tabriz
Tractor S.C. players
Sepahan S.C. footballers
Machine Sazi F.C. players
Association football defenders